Raouché is a residential and commercial neighborhood in Beirut, Lebanon. It is known for its upscale apartment buildings, numerous restaurants, and cliff-side cafés that line Avenue de Paris, which forms part of the Corniche Beirut.

Off the coast of Raouché, there is a natural landmark called the Pigeons' Rock (also known as the Rock of Raouché), consisting of two rock formations.

Etymology

Some historians believe that the word "raouché" derives from the Aramaic word rosh or Arabic word ras, both meaning head. Other historians argue that it is a corruption of the French word roche (rocher), meaning rock.

History
The shores near Raouché have yielded the area's oldest evidence of human existence, flints and basic stone tools, which are displayed in the American University of Beirut Archaeological Museum.

Present status
The area adjacent to Raouché, called 'Dalieh', is presently in the process of being sold to real-estate developers. A campaign was started early 2014 against the privatization of Raouché and the adjacent area-called al-Dalieh-which was initially titled "The last that remains".

See also

Beirut Central District
Avenue de Paris
Ras Beirut
Beirut

References

Neighbourhoods of Beirut